The 1970–71 Divizia B was the 31st season of the second tier of the Romanian football league system.

The format has been maintained to two series, each of them having 16 teams. At the end of the season the winners of the series promoted to Divizia A and the last two places from each series relegated to Divizia C.

Team changes

To Divizia B
Promoted from Divizia C
 ȘN Oltenița
 UM Timișoara
 CFR Pașcani
 Gloria Bistrița

Relegated from Divizia A
 Crișul Oradea
 ASA Târgu Mureș

From Divizia B
Relegated to Divizia C
 Chimia Suceava
 Chimia Râmnicu Vâlcea
 Gloria Bârlad
 Metalul Turnu Severin

Promoted to Divizia A
 Progresul București
 CFR Timișoara

Renamed teams 
Metalul Hunedoara was renamed as Corvinul Hunedoara.

Other teams 
Oțelul Galați gave away its place in the Divizia B to FC Galați, a newly formed team.

League tables

Serie I

Serie II

See also 
 1970–71 Divizia A
 1970–71 Divizia C
 1970–71 County Championship

References

Liga II seasons
Romania
2